Nelivaptan (INN) (developmental codename SSR-149,415) is a selective, orally active, non-peptide vasopressin receptor antagonist selective for the V1B subtype.  The drug had entered clinical trials for treatment of anxiety and depression. In July 2008, Sanofi-Aventis announced that further development of this drug had been halted.

See also
 ABT-436
 Balovaptan
 SRX-246
 TS-121

References

External links
 

Sanofi
Vasopressin receptor antagonists